The  La Salle Explorers football team  was an American football team representing La Salle University.  The team competed in the Metro Atlantic Athletic Conference (MAAC) football league at the NCAA Division I Football Championship Subdivision level (formerly I-AA).

History
The football program existed from 1931 to 1941, until the start of World War II.  The war reduced the number of male students at the university, so the football program ended in 1941.  It was revived in 1997 and joined the MAAC football league in 1999.

At the end of the 2007 Football season, in which the team finished 0–10, it was announced that La Salle would again be discontinuing the Football program.  The MAAC football league also dissolved soon thereafter.

In November 2009, the university settled a $7.5 million lawsuit with a football player who suffered a severe brain injury in a 2005 game.

Honors
Two La Salle football players, Mike Mandarino and George Somers, played in the National Football League (NFL).  The team had one undefeated season in 1934 (7–0–1) and former head coach Bill Manlove is a member of the College Football Hall of Fame.

Yearly records

References

 
1931 establishments in Pennsylvania
2007 disestablishments in Pennsylvania
American football teams established in 1931
American football teams disestablished in 2007